The Sports complex Mansiche is the current home of Trujillo's professional sports teams, a city of northern Peru. This sport complex will be the main site of 2013 Bolivarian Games that will be held in the city in November 2013. It is located near the old and traditional town of San Salvador de Mansiche.

Sport facilities
Estadio Mansiche
Coliseo Gran Chimu
 Swimming Pool, etc.

See also

San Salvador de Mansiche
Historic Centre of Trujillo
Chan Chan
Huanchaco
Puerto Chicama
Chimu
Pacasmayo beach
Plaza de Armas of Trujillo
Moche
Víctor Larco Herrera District
Vista Alegre
Buenos Aires
Las Delicias beach
Independence of Trujillo
Wall of Trujillo
Santiago de Huamán
Lake Conache
Marinera Festival
Trujillo Spring Festival
Wetlands of Huanchaco
Association of Breeders and Owners of Paso Horses in La Libertad
Salaverry beach
Puerto Morín
Virú culture
Marcahuamachuco
Wiracochapampa

External links

Map of Trujillo (Wikimapia)
"Huaca de la luna and Huaca del sol"
"Huacas del Sol y de la Luna Archaeological Complex", Official Website
Information on El Brujo Archaeological Complex
Chan Chan World Heritage Site, UNESCO
Chan Chan conservation project
Website about Trujillo, Reviews, Events, Business Directory

Multimedia
 
 
 
 Gallery pictures of Trujillo by Panoramio, Includes Geographical information by various authors
Colonial Trujillo photos

References

 
Sports in Trujillo, Peru
Sports complexes